Crewe Electric TMD (officially named Crewe IEMD – International Electric Maintenance Depot) is a traction maintenance depot for AC electric and diesel-electric locomotives. It is situated to the north-west of Crewe railway station on the Crewe to Chester railway line, opposite Crewe Works. Road access is from Wistaston Road and the depot is operated by DB Cargo UK. Starting in 1987, when Railfreight introduced depot plaques on its locomotives. Locomotives allocated to Crewe IEMD carried a plaque depicting an Eagle.

References

Rail Atlas Great Britain & Ireland, S.K. Baker

Further reading

External links
Depot Directory West Coast (Internet Archive)
An overhead view of the depot. Crewe Works is the long, rectangular building and Crewe Electric is on the branch of tracks to the south.

Railway depots in England
Rail transport in Cheshire